The Idle Valley Nature Reserve, also known as Lound Gravel Pits or Sutton and Lound Gravel Pits, is a wetland Site of Special Scientific Interest (SSSI) situated north-west of the town of Retford in the Bassetlaw district of north Nottinghamshire. The nature reserve is situated along the western bank of the River Idle and east of the villages of Sutton cum Lound and Lound. The nature reserve is managed by the Nottinghamshire Wildlife Trust.

History 

The lakes within the nature reserve have been formed over seventy years of extraction of gravel and other aggregates, and since 1981 by Tarmac Limited. Tarmac agreed to hand over all of its land within the SSSI to the Nottinghamshire Wildlife Trust. In 2002, Natural England designated the site, formally known as the Sutton And Lound Gravel Pits, a SSSI. The Idle Valley Learning Centre which offers diploma courses in environmental conservation from North Nottinghamshire College was opened in 2008 and is owned by the college. The nature reserve received £1 million in Lottery funding in 2008. Paths, fencing and clearing of land has also taken place since the handover of the land, the efforts of which in 2011 won Tarmac the Mineral Products Association Cooper-Heyman Cup double award. In 2017, a new boardwalk was constructed adjacent to the visitor centre in order to improve access to the reserve, as part of a partnership between the Nottinghamshire Wildlife Trust and the Rotary club of Retford.

Geography 

The reserve is over 3 miles long from the northernmost tip to the southern base of the site and covers over 450 hectares. It is the largest wetland in Nottinghamshire and the 5th largest SSSI in the county, covering 320 hectares.

Access and facilities

Idle Valley Nature Reserve is next to the A638 road and buses stop outside the reserve. Multiple public rights-of-way cross the reserve, including one around the majority of Bellmoor Lake. The reserve is open all year, and access is free, although visitors are asked to donate for using the car park. The main part of the reserve is accessed from the visitor centre. The northern end of the reserve can be accessed by walking from the visitor centre, although it is also accessible via Lound village.

The visitor centre and shop are open daily except Christmas Day. Most of the reserve and its facilities are wheelchair accessible, but some areas can be muddy and unsuitable for wheelchairs at times.

Fauna and flora

Birds
The site contains a rich number of breeding wetland birds and a nationally important population of wintering gadwall, one of 17 species of wildfowl that can be regularly found at the site each year.
Key breeding species include shoveler, great crested grebe and tufted duck, along with locally scarce breeding species such as wigeon and pochard. A number of breeding waders are also present, such as lapwing, Eurasian oystercatcher, little ringed plover  and redshank. The gravel pits contain a large winter population of coot.
259 bird species have been recorded across the site, including nationally rare species. Recently, these have included a gull-billed tern in 2015 and blue-winged teal and lesser scaup in 2014.

Mammals

In 2021, Nottinghamshire Wildlife Trust announced it had plans to reintroduce beavers into the reserve, after the species had been absent from Nottinghamshire for over 400 years. A licence application for the reintroduction of beavers submitted by the Trust to Natural England was approved in June 2021.

References

External links 

 Nottinghamshire Wildlife Trust - Idle Valley
 Notts Birders- Idle Valley/Lound

Sites of Special Scientific Interest in Nottinghamshire
Nottinghamshire Wildlife Trust
Retford